Salipeta is a  neighbourhood of Visakhapatnam, India. 

The locality Salipeta falls under the Greater Visakhapatnam Municipal Corporation, and it is one of the oldest localities in One Town (Visakhapatnam).

References

Neighbourhoods in Visakhapatnam